Sweet acacia is a common name for several plants and may refer to:

Acacia suaveolens, endemic to Australia
Vachellia farnesiana, native to Mexico and Central America, and widely introduced